Scudder's Row (possibly Scudders Row) is a historic row house in Savannah, Georgia, United States. It comprises the five homes from 1 to 9 East Gordon Street, in the southeastern residential block of Monterey Square, and was completed in 1853. It is a contributing property of the Savannah Historic District, itself on the National Register of Historic Places.

The properties were built between 1852 and 1853 by brothers John and Ephraim Scudder. John Scudder also built several of the homes on Savannah's Jones Street, which has been described as one of the most charming streets in America.

Other similar-style row houses exist in Savannah's Gordon Row, the Jones Street Quantock Row, the Chatham Square Quantock Row, William Remshart Row House, McDonough Row and Marshall Row.

Gallery

References

See also
11 East Jones Street, Savannah
15 East Jones Street, Savannah
Buildings in Savannah Historic District

Landmarks in Savannah, Georgia
Houses in Savannah, Georgia
Houses completed in 1853
Monterey Square (Savannah) buildings
Savannah Historic District